The College of Biological Sciences (CBS) is one of seven freshman-admitting colleges at the University of Minnesota. Established in 1869 as the College of Science, the College of Biological Science is now located across both the Minneapolis and the St. Paul campuses. The current interim dean is David Greenstein.

Institution

The College of Biological Sciences at the University of Minnesota is one of the few colleges nationwide devoted to biological sciences. CBS explores a world of opportunities, from molecules to ecosystems, to improve human health, develop renewable resources, enhance agriculture, and restore the environment. College of Biological Sciences undergraduates are among the most qualified at the University of Minnesota. The 2008 incoming freshman class, on average, had the highest class rank and ACT scores of any college within the university system.

There were 1,789 undergraduates registered for the fall of 2006 and 82 percent graduated in the top 15 percent of their high school class. There were a total of 377 freshmen and 135 faculty members.

CBS faculty conducts basic research on a range of applications in human health, agriculture, biotechnology and environmental sciences.

History
In 1887, the Animal Science Department was established in the College of Science, Letters, and Arts, followed by the Botany Department being created in 1891. Eight years later, the Lake Itasca Forestry and Biological Station was established with a forestry training program. It is now the site for the "Nature of Life" program CBS students must attend for four days in the summer before their freshman year. Then the Agricultural Biochemistry Department was formed within the Institute of Agriculture. In 1928, Snyder Hall, named for agricultural scientist Harry Snyder, was built to house Agricultural Biochemistry. Snyder Hall is now the headquarters for CBS, located on the St. Paul campus. In 1973, the Biological Sciences Center was built to house the botany department and the Genetics and Cell Biology Department.

In 1993, the Ecology Building was constructed on the St. Paul campus. Two years later, administration of the Bell Museum was transferred to the College of Natural Resources. In 1998, Dean Robert Elde led a university-wide reorganization to consolidate and realign departments in order to strengthen biological sciences and raise the university's national standing. The College of Biological Sciences’ (CBS) current structure grew out of that effort.

In 2001, Biodale opened, offering biological research support services to faculty, students, and industry. It is currently one of the most used resources on the University's campus. In 2004, University Enterprise Laboratories, Inc. was dedicated. Founding sponsors included Xcel Energy, the City of St. Paul, the University of Minnesota, 3M, Medtronic, Dorsey & Whitney, Surmodics, Guidant, Boston Scientific, and Ecolab.

Structures

Administrative offices for the College of Biological Sciences are located in Snyder Hall on the St. Paul campus. These include the Dean's Office, Communications, and Alumni Relations. Student services are located in the Molecular and Cellular Biology Building on the East Bank campus. The departments of Plant and Microbial Biology and Ecology, Evolution and Behavior are in adjacent buildings. The Cargill Building for Microbial and Plant Genomics is across the street. The Department of Biochemistry, Molecular Biology and Biophysics is located in Jackson Hall on the Minneapolis campus, and the Department of Genetics, Cell Biology and Development is in the Molecular and Cellular Biology Building on the Minneapolis Campus.

The Department of Biochemistry, Molecular Biology and Biophysics and the Department of Genetics, Cell Biology and Development are shared with the University of Minnesota Medical School. The Department of Plant and Microbial Biology is shared with the College of Food, Agricultural and Natural Resource Sciences (CFANS). The Department of Ecology, Evolution and Behavior remains exclusive to CBS with close ties to CFANS, which administers the Bell Museum of Natural History. The Department of Neuroscience and the Department of Microbiology—both part of the Medical School—are affiliated with CBS. The BioTechnology Institute is a joint effort of CBS and the Institute of Technology. CBS also operates two field stations—Cedar Creek Natural History Area, the birthplace of the modern science of ecosystem ecology, and Itasca Biological Station and Laboratories, used for education programs, field research, and public outreach.

Research facilities and fields

The College of Biological Sciences shares several researches, education and outreach facilities.

Biodale, CBS's resource for research support services, houses $40 million in bioscience research equipment that is available to faculty and industry scientists.

The Cargill Building for Microbial and Plant Genomics provides a hub for genomics researchers university-wide. Faculty conducts basic research in functional genomics of microbes and crop plants to identify innovative ways to make crops more resistant to disease and drought, clean up the environment, and improve human health.

The Molecular and Cellular Biology Building was opened in 2002 on the Minneapolis campus and houses classrooms and labs. It is home to the Department of Biochemistry, Molecular Biology, and Biophysics and the Department of Genetics, Cell Biology, and Development.

University Enterprise Laboratories (UEL) is a non-profit entity that provides lab space for biotech start-up companies. Sponsors include Xcel Energy, 3M, Allina, Medtronic, Boston Scientific, Dorsey & Whitney, Ecolab, Guidant Corporation, and Surmodics.

Itasca Biological Station and Laboratories established in 1909, houses many  buildings for research as well as the summer portion of the freshman program, "Nature of Life" which all incoming CBS freshman must attend before entering their first year at the university. This portion of Nature of Life prepares students for the upcoming year and gives them an idea of one of the research facilities provided by CBS and the university.  The program continues for the next 4 semesters, during which each enrolled student is expected to fully immerse themselves into CBS and university-wide events and communities.

Other research facilities include Cedar Creek Ecosystem Science Reserve, the Ecology Building, Plant Growth Facilities such as the CBS Conservatory and Botanical Collection, and Snyder Hall/Gortner Laboratories/Biological Sciences Center complex.

Notable faculty and staff
In 1995, Edward B. Lewis (B.S. '39) received the Nobel Prize in Physiology or Medicine for discovery of the collinearity principle in fruit flies, which revealed that the linear arrangement of genes on a chromosome corresponds to the development of body segments. The finding was later confirmed in humans.

In 1997, Paul D. Boyer won the Nobel Prize in Chemistry for the discovery of how cells make adenosine triphosphate (ATP). Boyer was on the faculty of the biochemistry department from 1945–1957.

G. David Tilman is the current director of Cedar Creek Ecosystem Science Reserve and member of the National Academy of Sciences. He is currently the most cited ecologist in the Web of Science database.

Majors offered

Biochemistry (BIOC)
Biology (BIOL)
Ecology, Evolution, and Behavior (EEB)
Genetics, Cell Biology, and Development (GCD)
Microbiology (MICB)
Neuroscience (NSC)
Plant and Microbial Biology (PMB)
Cellular and Organismal Physiology (COP)

Minors
Behavioral Biology
Biochemistry
Biology 
Cellular and Molecular Neuroscience
Computational Biology
Genetics
Integrative Neuroscience
Plant Biology
Marine Biology
Microbiology
Pharmacology

Graduate programs

Biochemistry, Molecular Biology, and Biophysics (BMBB)
Ecology, Evolution and Behavior (EEB)
Molecular, Cellular, Developmental Biology, and Genetics (MCDB&G)
Plant Biological Sciences

Research projects
In addition to the Nobel Prize winners for Physiology and biochemistry, other important research projects have been conducted by the university and CBS. Being a research based college, faculty and students often use related opportunities to research a variety of topics.
MCDB&G Faculty Research
BMBB Faculty Research
EEB Faculty Research

Grants
Funding is needed for all projects. One recently was the 2.8 million dollar grant from the National Science Foundation which supported interdisciplinary training for ecologists and civil engineers. This grant was used to train graduate students in ecology, civil engineering, and geology to study the combined effects of physical and biological changes on environmental quality, in particular the Mississippi River watershed.<ref name="ReferenceA">Greg Breining, Mary Hoff, Terri Peterson Smith, Peggy Rinard, "Star Search",  College of Biological Science BIO, Vol 4 No. 2, Fall 2005</ref>

Another grant was the $8.5 million grant from the Initiative for Renewable Energy and the Environment(IREE). Projects included bio-energy and bio-products; economic and policy assessments; production and distribution of hydrogen; carbon sequestration; Nanotechnology; solar thermal heating systems; and conversion of livestock waste to energy and products. They awarded this grant to 24 renewable energy projects at the university in August 2006, including CBS.

Student involvement

Leadership

Many CBS students are also involved in student organizations related to the biological sciences. Administrative sponsored student clubs include:

CBS Student Board 
CBS Events Board
CBS Ambassadors
Deans' Scholars Program
CBS Circles

Student groups 

University of Minnesota students also have the opportunity to create their own student groups. Examples of these student groups include:

AED Pre-Medical Honor Society
AMSA Premed
Biochemistry Club 
Biological Science Research Club
Biology Without Borders
Brain Club
Ecology, Evolution, and Behavior Club
Forensic Science Club
Future Leaders Aspiring in Science and Healthcare
Genetics, Cell Biology, and Development Club
Health and Biological Research News Club
Inter-Professional Pre-Health Students
Marine Biology Club
Microbiology Club
Microbiota in Health and Medicine Interest Group
Minnesota Medical Leaders
Minnesota Science and Business Association
Minority Association of Pre-Medical Students
MSTEM
Pharmacology Club
Pre-Dental Club
Pre-Genetic Counseling Club
Pre-Meds in Action
Pre-Occupational Therapy Group
Pre-Optometry Club
Pre-Pharmacy Club
Pre-Physical Therapy Club
Pre-Physician Assistant Organization
Pre-Veterinary Club
Student Society of Stem Cell Research Club
Synthetic Biology Society
Undergraduate Public Health Association
Undergraduate Surgery Interest Group

See also
University of Minnesota
List of University of Minnesota people
University of Minnesota Medical Center

References

Footnotes
"UNIVERSITY OF MINNESOTA, U.S.;Researchers from University of Minnesota, U.S., report recent findings".17 March 2007  
"A Smart Start For Bioscience", St. Paul Pioneer Press, 10 October 2004: B10
Breining Greg, Hoff Mary, Peterson Smith Terri, Rinard Peggy, "Star Search",  College of Biological Science BIO, Fall 2005, Vol 4 No.2
"The Wildest Classroom in Minnesota." Itasca Biological Station and Laboratories. 26 Mar. 2007. Regents of the University of Minnesota. 7 May 2007.<http://cbs.umn.edu/itasca/>
University of Minnesota, College of Biological Sciences
University Catalogs

External links
University of Minnesota, College of Biological Sciences

Educational institutions established in 1869
University of Minnesota
1869 establishments in Minnesota